The Best of Youth is a 2003 Italian historical drama film directed by Marco Tullio Giordana and written by Sandro Petraglia and Stefano Rulli. A family saga set in Italy from 1966 through 2003, it chronicles the life of the middle-class Carati family, focusing primarily on brothers Nicola (Luigi Lo Cascio) and Matteo (Alessio Boni) as their life paths separate during youth, encompassing major political and social events in post–World War II Italian history.

Originally conceived as a Rai television miniseries, it premiered at the 2003 Cannes Film Festival, where it won the Prize Un Certain Regard. It was then given a theatrical release in Italy as two 3-hour films (titled Act I and Act II), before being aired with broader success on Rai 1 in a slightly longer four-episode television version later that year. In the U.S., the film was released by Miramax in its theatrical version.

The title of the film, an ungrammatical rendition of La miglior gioventù ("the best youth/young people"), comes from the title of a 1954 Friulian language poetry collection by Pier Paolo Pasolini, who in turn borrowed it from a line of Alpini World War II song Sul ponte di Perati; here, Giordana uses it to refer to his generation, which is also the main characters' one, made up of those young people who participated in the Sessantotto.

Plot

Summer 1966
Two brothers go their separate ways after attempting to rescue a young girl, Giorgia (Jasmine Trinca), from an abusive sanitarium. The brothers are Matteo and Nicola Carati (Alessio Boni and Luigi Lo Cascio). Their parents are Angelo (Andrea Tidona) and Adriana (Adriana Asti), their older sister is Giovanna (Lidia Vitale), and their younger sister is Francesca (Valentina Carnelutti). Their friends, their lovers and others drift through, including Giorgia who struggles with mental issues, but whose life seems to follow in parallel.

Matteo walks out of his first exam, while Nicola passes an exam on his way to qualifying as a doctor (and will pursue a career in psychiatry). Matteo takes mental patients for walks to help them begin to feel normal and takes a particular interest in his patient Giorgia. Noticing that Giorgia has been wounded by electroshock therapy, he decides to remove her from the institution and take her along with him and Nicola—who are about to go on a trip to Norway.

Eventually, Giorgia is captured by the police and taken back to the asylum. Matteo, filled with sadness and depression, returns to Rome and joins the army.  Nicola continues to Norway and gets a job as a lumberjack. The brothers meet again in Florence just after the 1966 Arno River flood. Here, Nicola meets a university student, Giulia (Sonia Bergamasco).

February 1968
Nicola and Giulia are living together in Turin, but the two do not marry.

1974
Matteo leaves the army and joins the police force. During this time, Matteo shows signs of continuing depression and anger. He accepts an assignment in Sicily, a place corrupted by the Mafia. Meanwhile, Nicola and Giulia conceive and care for Sara, their daughter.

1977
In Sicily, Matteo meets a photographer in a caffè named Mirella (Maya Sansa). She wants to be a librarian, and he advises her to work at a beautiful library in Rome.

Because of his temper, Matteo is forced to leave Sicily. He decides to reside in Rome but refuses to visit his mother.

Meanwhile, Nicola becomes a psychiatrist, and works to eliminate the abuse and maltreatment of patients in mental hospitals. He finds Giorgia in one of these hospitals. She is tied to a bed in inhumane conditions, does not talk, and shows fear of being touched by others.
After some time, Giulia gets drawn into a secret Red Brigades cell. One night, she leaves Nicola and Sara and disappears into the terrorist underground.

1983
Years later Matteo walks into that same library and sees Mirella for the second time. They fall in love, and one evening, make love in a car.  Eventually he pushes her away.

December 1983
Mirella meets with Matteo with news for him, but he behaves harshly and forces her to leave. On New Year's Eve, Matteo decides to finally visit his mother. Everyone is there to celebrate. Instead of waiting for the traditional toasts, however, Matteo decides to leave early and, at midnight, jumps off the balcony of his apartment and kills himself.

The family is devastated by the tragedy. No longer motivated, Nicola's mother quits her teaching job and lives a life in solitude in Rome. Nicola, feeling that he could have saved Matteo and not wanting to make the same mistake again, arranges for the capture of Giulia to prevent her from killing someone else or from getting killed. She is sentenced to 17 years in jail. During her jail term, Nicola visits Giulia and proposes to her but is rejected.

Spring 1992
Nicola finds a photograph of Matteo taken by Mirella. He is encouraged by Giorgia to meet with Mirella which, after some hesitation, he agrees to do. When he meets Mirella, Nicola learns about her son (Andrea) and that Matteo was the father. Nicola breaks this exciting news to his mother and they visit Mirella and the boy on the small island of Stromboli. Inspired by new meaning in her life, Nicola's mother decides to stay with Mirella and her grandson.

Spring 1995
Nicola and his friends acquire and plan the reconstruction of an old villa house in Tuscany. Giulia (out of jail) meets Francesca but chooses not to talk to Sara, watching her from afar. Meanwhile, Sara, now in her early twenties, is still struggling with the poor choices her mother has made. She decides to move to Rome to study art conservation and becomes engaged to Mimmo. During this time, Nicola finds out his mother has died and, as a result, travels to Stromboli to visit Mirella and pay his respects.

Spring 2000
Having finally moved past the death of Matteo, Nicola and Mirella fall in love. Sara, now happy and strong, is encouraged by Nicola to confront her mother and try to patch things up. Giulia, in desperate need of love, embraces Sara, but is not ready to open up completely.

2003
The film ends with Matteo's son, Andrea, visiting Norway, specifically North Cape, which is where his father and Nicola ventured to go at the beginning of the movie, but never completed their journey.

Cast 

Luigi Lo Cascio as Nicola Carati
Alessio Boni as Matteo Carati
Jasmine Trinca as Giorgia
Adriana Asti as Adriana Carati
Sonia Bergamasco as Giulia Monfalco
Fabrizio Gifuni as Carlo Tommasi
Maya Sansa as Mirella Utano
Valentina Carnelutti as Francesca Carati
Nila Carnelutti as Francesca Carati at 8
Andrea Tidona as Angelo Carati
Lidia Vitale as Giovanna Carati
Claudio Gioè as Vitale Micavi
Paolo Bonanni as Luigino
Giovanni Scifoni as Berto
Riccardo Scamarcio as Andrea Utano
Francesco La Macchia as Andrea Utano at 6
Camilla Filippi as Sara Carati
Greta Cavuoti as Sara Carati at 8
Sara Pavoncello as Sara Carati at 5
Mario Schiano as medicine professor

Michele Melega as literature professor
Thérèse Vadem as Therese
Stefano Abbati as pusher
Giovanni Martorana as Maghrebi
Paolo De Vita as Don Vito
Mimmo Mignemi as Giorgia's father
Domenico Centamore as Officer Enzo
Pippo Montalbano as Police Chief in Palermo
Gaspare Cucinella as 'Viddanu
Dario Veca as butcher
Nicola Vigilante as nurse
Marcello Prayer as Second Lieutenant
Walter Da Pozzo as Officer Mario
Krum De Nicola as Brigo
Maurizio Di Carmine as terrorist
Roberto Accornero as President of the Court in Turin
Fabio Camilli as Tangentopoli inmate
Antonello Puglisi as priest in Palermo
Patrizia Punzo as gallery manager
Emilia Marra as doctor

Production 
Principal photography began in March 2002, taking place mainly in Florence, Turin and Collegno in the following months. On 26 June 2002, filming moved to Stromboli, lasting three days. Filming also took place in Rome and North Cape, Norway.

Release 
Originally set for a television broadcast on Rai 2, The Best of Youth was bought by Rai 1 and then indefinitely shelved from its scheduled air date of fall 2002. Set for February 2003, it was delayed again after TV spots had already aired. Freedom of expression association Articolo 21, liberi di... accused Rai 1 director Agostino Saccà and his successor Fabrizio Del Noce of making a politically charged use of public television in favor of the Berlusconi government (see Editto Bulgaro). In April, the film was selected for the Cannes Film Festival, where it had its world premiere on 20 May 2003, competing in the Un Certain Regard sidebar. Here, it received the Prize Un Certain Regard along with widespread critical acclaim, credited as having rekindled Rai's interest, who decided to give the film a theatrical release before airing it.

Due to its extensive runtime, The Best of Youth was divided in two parts for its theatrical release in Italy, premiering on 7 and 8 June 2003 at the Taormina Film Festival: the first part was released by 01 Distribution on 20 June, followed by the second one on 27 June. A four-part version, with an additional 20 minutes of running time, was finally broadcast from 7 to 15 December 2003 on Rai 1 at 8:45 pm:

Reception
On Rotten Tomatoes, the film has an approval rating of 94%, with an average rating of 8.40/10, based on 63 reviews, the critic consensus says that the film "earns its 6 hours running time by telling an engrossing story with compelling characters." On Metacritic, the film has a score (using a weighted average) of 89 out of 100, indicating "universal acclaim".
According to film critic Peter Bradshaw, the film falls within the tradition of several films that cover expansive times of Italian history through the story of one family, such as Rocco and His Brothers and The Leopard.

Accolades

See also 
List of longest films by running time

References

Further reading
 Sandro Petraglia & Stefano Rulli (2004). , Rai Radiotelevisione Italiana.

External links

2003 drama films
2003 films
2000s historical drama films
Italian historical drama films
Films about schizophrenia
Films directed by Marco Tullio Giordana
Films set in Florence
Films set in Norway
Films set in Palermo
Films set in Rome
Films set in Turin
Films set in 1966
Films set in 1968
Films set in 1974
Films set in 1977
Films set in 1983
Films set in 1992
Films set in 2000
Films set in 2003
Films shot in Florence
Films shot in Norway
Films shot in Rome
Films released in separate parts
1968 protests